Artus or Arthus is a Breton surname or name which means "bear" (cf. arth), and may refer to:
 Amédée Artus (1815–1892), French conductor and composer of operettas
 Alexandre Artus (1821–1911), French conductor and composer of classical music
  (born 1962), French journalist
  (born 1951), French economist and alumnus of ENSAE ParisTech
  (born 1987), French comedian who appeared in Danse avec les stars
 Artus de Cossé-Brissac (1512–1582), French military man, diplomat, and finance minister
 Artus de Penguern (1957–2013), French director, writer and actor
 Henri Arthus (1872–1962), French skipper
 Nicolas Maurice Arthus (1862–1945), French immunologist and physiologist
 Yann Arthus-Bertrand (born 1946), French photographer, journalist, reporter and environmentalist
  (1796–1872), French physician
 Artus Enriquez (born 1997), Filipino Architect, artist, illustrator, birdwatcher

See also
 Arthus (disambiguation)
 Artus (disambiguation)

Surnames of Breton origin